Morton Ann Gernsbacher is Vilas Research Professor and Sir Frederic Bartlett Professor of Psychology at the University of Wisconsin–Madison. She is a specialist in autism and psycholinguistics and has written and edited professional and lay books and over 100 peer-reviewed articles and book chapters on these subjects. She is currently on the advisory board of the journal Psychological Science in the Public Interest and associate editor for Cognitive Psychology, and she has previously held editorial positions for Memory & Cognition and Language and Cognitive Processes. She was also president of the Association for Psychological Science in 2007.

Biography and research interests
Gernsbacher received a B.A. from the University of North Texas in 1976, an M.S. from University of Texas at Dallas in 1980, and a Ph.D. from the University of Texas at Austin in human experimental psychology in 1983. She was employed at the University of Oregon from 1983-1992 before joining the faculty at the University of Wisconsin–Madison, where she has remained ever since.

Gernsbacher's research focuses on the cognitive processes and mechanisms that underlie language comprehension. She has challenged the view that language processing depends upon language-specific mechanisms, proposing instead that it draws on general cognitive processes such as working memory and pattern recognition. During recent years, motivated by the diagnosis of her son, Gernsbacher's research has focused on the cognitive and neurological processes of people with autism. As a result of investigating the language development of children with autism, Gernsbacher has posited that the speech difficulties associated with autism stem from motor planning challenges, not from intellectual limitations or social impairment. The implications of this perspective include a shift in focus from deficits in interpersonal communication to early sensory-motor challenges of children with autism, as well as recognition of previously unidentified competence in nonverbal children with autism.

Gernsbacher is married and has one child.

Honors (selected)
2007 William James Distinguished Lecturer in Psychological Science, Southeastern Psychological Association
2007 John Kendall Lecturer in Psychology, Gustavus Adolphus College
2006 President of the Association for Psychological Science (formerly the American Psychological Society)
2003 Elected Fellow of the Society of Experimental Psychologists
2001 Senior research fellowship, National Institute of Deafness and Communication Disorders, National Institutes of Health
2000 Distinguished Scientist Lecturer, American Psychological Association
1999 Vilas Associate Research Award, University of Wisconsin–Madison
1998 Professional Opportunities for Women in Research and Education Award (POWRE), National Science Foundation
1995 Elected Fellow of the American Association for the Advancement of Science
1994 Named “Sir Frederic C. Bartlett Professor,” University of Wisconsin–Madison
1993 Elected Fellow of the American Psychological Society (now the Association for Psychological Science)
1992 Elected Fellow of the American Psychological Association

References

External links
Web site at the University of Wisconsin.

American women psychologists
Autism researchers
American cognitive neuroscientists
Fellows of the American Association for the Advancement of Science
Fellows of the Society of Experimental Psychologists
Living people
Psycholinguists
University of North Texas alumni
University of Texas at Austin College of Liberal Arts alumni
University of Wisconsin–Madison faculty
American women neuroscientists
Year of birth missing (living people)
American women academics
21st-century American women scientists